Achoria is a genus of moth in the family Lecithoceridae. It contains the species Achoria inopina, which is found in Australia, where it has been recorded from New South Wales.

The forewings are whitish-ochreous suffusedly irrorated throughout with dark bronzy-fuscous. The hindwings are pale fuscous, with the basal and discal areas wholly tawny-ochreous.

References

Natural History Museum Lepidoptera genus database

Lecithocerinae
Monotypic moth genera